The Yavuz Selim Mosque, also known as the Selim I Mosque and the Yavuz Sultan Selim Mosque is a 16th-century Ottoman imperial mosque located at the top of the 5th Hill of Istanbul, Turkey, in the neighborhood of Çukurbostan, overlooking the Golden Horn. Its size and geographic position make it a familiar landmark on the Istanbul skyline.

History
The Yavuz Selim Mosque is the second oldest extant imperial mosque in Istanbul. It was commissioned by the Ottoman sultan Suleiman the Magnificent in memory of his father Selim I who died in 1520. The architect was Alaüddin (Acem Alisi). The mosque was completed in 1527/8.   Attempts have been made to associate the structure with the famous imperial architect Mimar Sinan, but there is no supporting documentary evidence, and the date of the mosque is too early. However, one of the türbe in the garden of the mosque is a work of Sinan (see below).

Architecture

Exterior
The mosque was built on a terrace overlooking the Cistern of Aspar, the largest of the three Roman reservoirs in Constantinople. The large courtyard (avlu) has a colonnaded portico with columns of various types of marble and granite. The mosque has panels of coloured tiles that were decorated using the cuerda seca technique. These are similar to the lunette panels above the windows on either side of the fireplace in the Circumcision Room (Sünnet Odası) of the Topkapı Palace and were almost certainly made by the same group of Iranian craftsmen working for the Ottoman court.  The mosque is flanked by twin minarets.

Interior
The interior plan of the mosque is a simple square room,  on each side, covered by a shallow dome  in height. As with the Hagia Sophia, the dome is much shallower than a full hemisphere. The windows are decorated with lunette panels of polychrome cuerda seca tiles. To the north and south of the main room, domed passages led to four small domed rooms, which were intended to function as hospices for traveling dervishes.

Tombs
Located in the garden behind the mosque and overlooking the Golden Horn is the türbe of Sultan Selim I which was completed in 1523. The building is externally octagonal, and has a porch decorated with panels of tiles of unique design. 

A second octagonal türbe with a long inscription carved into the stonework of the exterior contains the tombs of four children of Suleiman the Magnificent. It dates from 1556, and is attributed to Mimar Sinan. The third türbe in the garden is that of Sultan Abdülmecid I, built shortly before his death in 1861.

Gallery

See also
 List of mosques
 Ottoman architecture
 Mosques commissioned by the Ottoman dynasty

References

Sources

Further reading

External links

Sultan Selim Külliyesi, Archnet.
 Photographs of the mosque taken by Dick Osseman
 Arkitera.com - Yavuz Sultan Selim Mosque is under restoration

Religious buildings and structures completed in 1528
16th-century mosques
Mimar Sinan buildings
Ottoman mosques in Istanbul
Madrasas in Turkey
1528 establishments in the Ottoman Empire